Robert Floyd (born May 6, 1967) is an American television and film actor.

Career
He has appeared in several independent films as well as the feature film Godzilla. He has also guest starred on a variety of television series including Dark Angel, Walker, Texas Ranger and NCIS.

He is best known for his role as Mallory in the science fiction television show Sliders. He appeared in 18 episodes, aired from 1999 until 2000 on the Sci-Fi Channel.

Filmography

External links
 

1967 births
American male film actors
American male television actors
Living people
Place of birth missing (living people)